SS Cape Gibson (AK-5051) was a Cape G Class Break bulk cargo ship of the United States Maritime Administration, last used as a training ship at Texas A&M University at Galveston before being scrapped in 2020.

History
The ship was originally delivered as SS Indian Mail a class C5-S-75a ship, to American Mail Line, of Seattle in 1968 as one of five C5-S-75a class breakbulk cargo container ships (the others being SS Alaskan Mail, SS American Mail, SS Korea Mail, and SS Hong Kong Mail).   With the onset of containerization, this type of cargo ship was approaching obsolescence, but this class was well equipped for handling a wide variety of cargoes. The ship was later acquired by American President Lines and name was changed to SS President Jackson. In 1988 the ship was transferred to MARAD, renamed SS Cape Gibson and mothballed in the National Defense Reserve Fleet at Alameda, California. She was assigned to the Military Sealift Command as a  Modular Cargo Delivery System Ship and capable of being reactivated in five days.
In November 2002 the Cape Gibson was activated in preparation for Operation Iraqi Freedom with a West Coast US Merchant Marine crew. It sailed From Indian Island, Washington, to Diego Garcia, arriving in February 2003. After a two week stay, a US Navy cargo aboard rig team (CART) was boarded there. It then steamed into the Persian Gulf as part of the USS Constellation Carrier group Where it provided ammunition to the Fleet (VERTREP) for the duration of hostilities. After over 60 days at sea the ship returned to Diego Garcia for a short stay, discharging the CART team. 
It then Returned home to Indian Island via Saipan in the Marianas Islands and the US Naval Base at Sasebo, Japan. The Cape Gibson remained activated for several Trans-Pacific voyages.
In 2009 SS Cape Gibson was reactivated as training ship for Texas A&M Maritime Academy cadets, serving until 2012 until being replaced by TS General Rudder. She was subsequently placed in the Beaumont Reserve Fleet. In August 2016 she was designated for disposal and scrapped on 3 October 2020.

References

External links
 Cape G class breakbulk maintenance in the 1990s
 Detailed description of C5-S-75a cargo ships
 

United States Merchant Marine
Ships built in Newport News, Virginia
Beaumont Reserve Fleet
Type C5 ships
1968 ships